John Ely Burchard (December 8, 1898 Marshall, Minnesota - December 25, 1975 Boston) was an American professor and dean at the Massachusetts Institute of Technology (MIT). He was a historian and architectural critic. He was President of the American Academy of Arts and Sciences from 1954 to 1957.

He attended the University of Minnesota for two and a half years, served in World War I, and returned to study at MIT, obtaining a bachelor's degree in 1923 and a master's in 1925.

Burchard started his career at Bemis Industries as research director, vice president, and director. He was appointed professor at MIT in 1938. From 1940 to 1945, he was affiliated with the National Research Council and the National Defense Research Committee. For his war work, he received a Medal for Merit in 1948.

Burchard was the first dean of MIT's School of Humanities and Social Science, serving from 1950 to 1969.

The John E. Burchard Professor of Humanities is an endowed chair named in his honor.
MIT holds his papers.

Works 

 Bernini is dead? Architecture and the Social Purpose, 1976, 
 with Albert Bush-Brown, The architecture of America; a social and cultural history, 3rd ed., 1967
 The voice of the phoenix; postwar architecture in Germany, 1966
 with Oscar Handlin, The Historian and the City, 1963

References 

1975 deaths
1898 births
People from Marshall, Minnesota
Massachusetts Institute of Technology faculty
Architectural historians